The  frazione Castelnuovo is a small town established in the Middle Ages in the Avezzano comune, 8 kilometers from Avezzano itself, within the province of L'Aquila, Abruzzo region, in the Apennine Mountains within the centre (geometry) of Italy. Its population in 2001 was 182.

References

Frazioni of Avezzano